Zêkog County is the second largest administrative subdivision by area within Huangnan Tibetan Autonomous Prefecture in eastern Qinghai Province, China, bordering Gansu to the east.

Climate
Zêkog County has an alpine climate (Köppen ETH) due to very high elevation.

See also
 List of administrative divisions of Qinghai

References

External links
Official website of Zêkog County Government

County-level divisions of Qinghai
Amdo
Huangnan Tibetan Autonomous Prefecture